Witold Doroszewski (1899–1976) was a Polish lexicographer and linguist.

External links 

1899 births
1976 deaths
Commanders of the Order of Polonia Restituta
Members of the Polish Academy of Sciences
Polish lexicographers
Linguists from Poland
Recipients of the Cross of Valour (Poland)
University of Warsaw alumni
Academic staff of the University of Warsaw
20th-century linguists
Recipients of the State Award Badge (Poland)
20th-century lexicographers